

Awards 
Winners are listed first and highlighted in boldface.

References

External links
 Indie Series Awards History and Archive of Past Winners

Indie Series Awards
2010 film awards